Leonel Ezequiel Felice (born 31 April 1983) is an Argentine professional footballer who plays for S.League club Geylang International, as a striker.

Career
Leonel Felice started his youth career in Arsenal Fútbol Club in Argentina before moving to Quilmes Atlético Club in 2005. In 2006, he was released by Quilmes and was clubless for a year before joining Club Rivadavia in 2008 and spent 4 years with the club before moving to Vietnamese club Hanoi T&T in 2012. He then signed with Geylang International in 2014, which plays in the S.League and proved to be a prolific goalscorer at his present club, scoring 16 goals in his debut season with the club.

References

Living people
Argentine footballers
Argentine expatriate footballers
1983 births
Association football forwards
Hanoi FC players
V.League 1 players
Geylang International FC players
Arsenal de Sarandí footballers
Singapore Premier League players
Expatriate footballers in Singapore
Expatriate footballers in Vietnam
Than Quang Ninh FC players